Cartier  was a federal electoral district in Quebec, Canada, that was represented in the House of Commons of Canada from 1925 to 1968. The riding covered much of Montreal's old Jewish district (from 1933 including parts of the Mile End neighbourhood). It was one of the smallest ridings in the country in area.

It was created in 1924 from parts of George-Étienne Cartier riding.

Cartier is the only riding in Canada to have elected a Communist to the House of Commons: Fred Rose, who was elected in a 1943 by-election, and re-elected in 1945. Rose ran under the banner of the Labor-Progressive Party, which was a front organization for the banned Communist Party of Canada during the 1940s and 1950s. Sam Jacobs was the riding's MP for many years and was in his final years also the president of the Canadian Jewish Congress.

The electoral district was abolished in 1966 when it was redistributed into Laurier, Outremont and Saint-Jacques ridings.

Every single MP to represent this riding was Jewish.

Members of Parliament

Election results

See also 

 List of Canadian federal electoral districts
 Past Canadian electoral districts

References

External links
Riding history from the Library of Parliament

Former federal electoral districts of Quebec